Amanda Martínez Encina (born 9 March 2000) is a field hockey player from Chile.

Career

Junior national team
Amanda Martínez made her debut for the Chile U–21 team at the 2021 Pan American Junior Championship in Santiago. She was the scorer of Chile's opening goal of the tournament.

Las Diablas
Following her junior debut, Martínez was named in the Las Diablas squad for the first time the in 2021. She made her international debut the following year at the inaugural FIH Nations Cup in Valencia.

References

External links

2000 births
Living people
Chilean female field hockey players
Female field hockey defenders